Arbatan (also Romanized as Arbaţān; also known as Arabatan) is a village in Bedevostan-e Gharbi Rural District of Khvajeh District, Heris County, East Azerbaijan province, Iran. At the 2006 National Census, its population was 2,824 in 670 households. The following census in 2011 counted 3,167 people in 851 households. The latest census in 2016 showed a population of 3,233 people in 936 households; it was the largest village in its rural district.

References 

Heris County

Populated places in East Azerbaijan Province

Populated places in Heris County